The 2019 FC Okzhetpes season is the club's first season back in the Kazakhstan Premier League following their relegation at the end of the 2017 season, and 28th season in total.

Squad

Transfers

In

Loans in

Released

Trial

Competitions

Premier League

Results summary

Results by round

Results

League table

Kazakhstan Cup

Squad statistics

Appearances and goals

|-
|colspan="14"|Players away from Okzhetpes on loan:
|-
|colspan="14"|Players who left Okzhetpes during the season:

|}

Goal scorers

Disciplinary record

References

FC Okzhetpes seasons
Okzhetpes